Charles Taylor Bernard, Sr. (September 10, 1927 – June 27, 2015) was an American businessman and politician originally from Earle in Crittenden County in eastern Arkansas. He is best known as the 1968 Republican nominee for the United States Senate seat held by long-time Democrat J. William Fulbright of Fayetteville.

Background
Bernard attended Baylor University in Waco, Texas, where he became enamored with the poetry of Robert Browning, whom he often quoted. He farmed cotton at Earle and operated One Hour Martenizing dry cleaning establishments in eastern Arkansas.

In 2013, he was listed as a resident of Naples, Florida. His obituary indicates that he also resided in Maui, Hawaii. Bernard and his wife, the former Betty Hill (born c. 1931), who still resides in Earle, had five children: Sallie Hill Armstrong (husband Robert) of Reno, Nevada; Mary Troy Johnston (Kauai, Hawaii), Charles Taylor Bernard, Jr., and wife Elaine of Memphis, Tennessee; David Wesley Bernard and wife Virginia Caris of Birmingham, Alabama, and John Harbert Bernard and wife Mary Reynolds of Atlanta, Georgia.

His obituary indicated that after the middle 1980s he lived with Jaynie Moon (born c. 1941). The obituary does not indicated if he divorced Betty. At the age of seventy-five, Bernard hiked with all the men of his family to the bottom of the Grand Canyon; at eighty-two, he completed a seven-mile combination kayak tour and trail to the waterfall in the Wailua River Valley on Kauai, Hawaii.

Political activities

Although Fulbright was comfortably re-elected, Bernard, later the Republican state chairman from 1971 to 1973, was his strongest Republican rival, for in all previous contests Fulbright had been returned to office unopposed or without significant opposition. In the primary, Fulbright had handily defeated James D. Johnson of Conway, a segregationist Democrat who had lost the 1966 gubernatorial general election to Republican Winthrop Rockefeller. Fulbright won his final election with 59.2 percent to Bernard's 40.2 percent. Bernard's ticket mate, Governor Rockefeller, scored a second two-year term by defeating the Democrat Marion H. Crank of Foreman in Little River County in southwestern Arkansas. Crank had earlier defeated Johnson's wife, Virginia Morris Johnson, in the Democratic gubernatorial runoff election.

In 1970, Bernard and then Republican State Representative George E. Nowotny of Fort Smith both considered running for governor had Rockefeller not sought a third term.

Bernard won the state chairmanship to succeed Odell Pollard of Searcy in White County in balloting before the GOP State Committee held in Little Rock after Rockefeller's defeat for governor in 1970. Bernard defeated Rockefeller's stated choice, William T. Kelly, Sr., of Little Rock, the Pulaski County chairman, and Everett Ham, a Rockefeller aide. The vote was 137 for Bernard, 28 for Kelly, and 27 for Ham. Delegates then named Ham as the vice chairman. John L. Ward, a Rockefeller biographer, said that Rockefeller's aides "felt like Bernard and the party had kicked Rockefeller's teeth in."  Years later, Robert Faulkner, Rockefeller's executive secretary in 1970, said that Bernard's victory for the chairmanship showed that many pre-Rockefeller Republicans in Arkansas "couldn't wait to throw out the Rockefeller influence and pick their own, more conservative, traditional Republican." However, Bernard's obituary indicates that he like Rockefeller was a strong defender of civil rights. During his chairmanship, Governor Ronald W. Reagan of California visited Bernard while Reagan was in Arkansas to campaign for various Republican candidates.

Bernard died in Memphis, Tennessee, at the age of eighty-seven, but it is unclear if he was a Memphis resident in his last years. He was cremated. According to his obituary, Bernard "always remained a combination of a small town boy and larger than life figure, making himself big enough for any challenge but always remaining a true Southern gentleman.

References

 Charles T. Bernard at The Political Graveyard

1927 births
2015 deaths
Arkansas Republicans
Arkansas Republican state chairmen
People from Crittenden County, Arkansas
Baylor University alumni
Businesspeople from Arkansas
People from Naples, Florida
People from Hawaii
People from Memphis, Tennessee
20th-century American businesspeople
Florida Republicans
Hawaii Republicans
Tennessee Republicans